Massachusetts House of Representatives' 9th Plymouth district in the United States is one of 160 legislative districts included in the lower house of the Massachusetts General Court. It covers part of the city of Brockton in Plymouth County. Democrat Gerry Cassidy of Brockton has represented the district since 2017.

The current district geographic boundary overlaps with that of the Massachusetts Senate's 2nd Plymouth and Bristol district.

Representatives
 Foster Tinkham, circa 1858 
 Everett Robinson, circa 1859 
 George M. Hooper, circa 1888 
 Emil K. Steele, circa 1920 
 John George Asiaf, circa 1951 
 Robert S. Teahan, circa 1975 
 Gerry Cassidy, 2017–present

Former locale
The district previously covered Middleborough, circa 1872.

See also
 List of Massachusetts House of Representatives elections
 Other Plymouth County districts of the Massachusetts House of Representatives: 1st, 2nd, 3rd, 4th, 5th, 6th, 7th, 8th, 10th, 11th, 12th
 List of Massachusetts General Courts
 List of former districts of the Massachusetts House of Representatives

Images
Portraits of legislators

References

External links
 Ballotpedia
  (State House district information based on U.S. Census Bureau's American Community Survey).

House
Government of Plymouth County, Massachusetts